Blue Lake Provincial Park is a park in Kenora District, Ontario, Canada, located  northwest of the community of Vermilion Bay. It can be accessed via Ontario Highway 647.

References

External links

Provincial parks of Ontario
Parks in Kenora District
Protected areas established in 1990
1990 establishments in Ontario